James Mathers (30 June 1894 – 28 March 1977) was an Australian cricketer. He played one first-class cricket match for Victoria in 1923.

See also
 List of Victoria first-class cricketers

References

External links
 

1894 births
1977 deaths
Australian cricketers
Victoria cricketers
Cricketers from Newcastle, New South Wales